Events from the year 2007 in Europe.

Events

 January 3
Celebrity Big Brother 5 was launched on Channel 4, with celebrities such as Jermaine Jackson, Dirk Benedict and Leo Sayer.
National Express coach accident: A National Express coach from London Heathrow Airport to Aberdeen, Scotland crashed on a slip road between the M4 and the M25, killing two people and injuring thirty-six others.
 January 8: The Russia-Belarus energy dispute escalates.
 February 2: Orange Snow fell in Sibera,  most likely caused by sandstorms in neighboring Kazakhstan.
 March 17: UTair Flight 471 ends with a hard landing, killing at least 6 people and injuring 20 others.
 March 19: The Ulyanovskaya Mine disaster, a methane explosion Kemerovo Oblast, killing at least 108 people.
 April: It is reported in Forbes magazine, an American publication, that Russia now has 60 billionaires, mostly living in Moscow, which is believed to have more millionaires than any other city in the world. 15 years ago, Russia did not even have any millionaires.
 April 27: A Mil Mi-8 helicopter crashes in Chechnya, killing all 20 federal troops aboard.
 July 10 – August 4: The Arktika 2007 expedition commences, which is the first crewed descent to the ocean bottom at the North Pole.
 Summer: The Dissenters March, which began in December 2006, continue throughout the summer.
 September 7: Russian personnel are ambushed in the Vedeno region of Chechnya.
 November 15: The Guerilla phase of the Second Chechen War continues.
 November 24: Anti-Putin Protests, led by former world chess champion Garry Kasparov, erupted in Saint Petersburg and Moscow.
 December 2: A Chechen constitutional referendum was held in Chechnya.
 December 2: The Legislative elections for seats in the State Duma resulted in a majority win by United Russia.

Births
 12 March – Xan Windsor, Lord Culloden, elder child of the Earl and Countess of Ulster
 17 December – James (then Viscount Severn, now Earl of Wessex), son of Prince Edward and Sophie (then Earl and Countess of Wessex, now Duke and Duchess of Edinburgh)

Deaths

January
 3 January – Sir Cecil Walker, Ulster Unionist Member of Parliament for North Belfast (1983–2001) (born 1924)
 4 January – Grenfell (Gren) Jones, newspaper cartoonist (born 1934)
 7 January – Magnus Magnusson, journalist and broadcaster (Mastermind) (born 1929)
 8 January
 David Ervine, leader of the Progressive Unionist Party (born 1953)
 Francis Cockfield, Baron Cockfield, politician and European Commissioner (born 1916)
 27 January – Paul Channon, Baron Kelvedon, Member of Parliament (born 1935)
 30 January – Griffith Jones, actor (born 1910)

February
 9 February
Ian Richardson, actor (born 1934)
 16 February – Sheridan Morley, theatre critic (born 1941)

March
 4 March – Ian Wooldridge, sports journalist (born 1932)
 7 March – Lady Thorneycroft, philanthropist (born 1914)
 8 March – John Inman, actor (born 1935)
 14 March
Tommy Cavanagh, former footballer and football manager (born 1928)
Gareth Hunt, actor (born 1942)
 16 March
 Sally Clark, lawyer and victim of a miscarriage of justice (born 1964)
 Sir Arthur Marshall, aviation pioneer and businessman (born 1903)
 17 March – Freddie Francis, cinematographer and film director (born 1917)
 18 March – Bob Woolmer, cricketer and cricket coach (born 1948); died suddenly in Jamaica
 28 March – Sir Thomas Hetherington, barrister (born 1926)
 30 March
Fay Coyle, former footballer (born 1933)
Michael Dibdin, crime writer (born 1947)

April
April 23 – Boris Yeltsin, 1st President of Russia (1991 to 1999)
 24 April – Alan Ball, former footballer and football manager (born 1945)

June
 18 June – Bernard Manning, comedian (born 1930)

July
 5 July – George Melly, jazz singer (born 1926)
 29 July
Phil Drabble, author and television presenter (born 1914)
Mike Reid, comedian and actor (born 1940)
 31 July – R. D. Wingfield, novelist and radio dramatist (born 1928)

August
 10 August – Tony Wilson, broadcaster, nightclub manager, and record label owner (born 1950)
 25 August – Ray Jones, footballer (born 1988)

September
 10 September – Anita Roddick, environmentalist, political campaigner, businesswoman (The Body Shop) (born 1942)
 11 September – Ian Porterfield, footballer and football manager (born 1946)
 15 September – Colin McRae, rally driver (born 1968)

October
 1 October – Ronnie Hazlehurst, composer (born 1928)
 16 October – Deborah Kerr, actress (born 1921)
 18 October – Alan Coren, columnist (born 1938)

November
 6 November – Hilda Braid, British actress (born 1929)
 22 November – Verity Lambert, British television producer (born 1935)
 28 November – Tony Holland, British television producer and writer (born 1940)

December
 1 December – Anton Rodgers, British actor (born 1933)
 29 December
 Phil O'Donnell, British footballer (born 1972); died while playing
 Kevin Greening, British radio presenter (born 1962)

References